The 2008 Scottsdale mayoral election was held on November 4, 2008 to elect the mayor of Scottsdale, Arizona. It saw the election of Jim Lane, who unseated incumbent Mary Manross.

Results

Primary
The primary was held September 2, 2008.

General election

References 

2008
Scottsdale
Scottsdale